Ivon is a masculine given name. Notable people with the name include:

 Ivon Hitchens (1893-1979), English painter
 Ivon Le Duc (21st century), Canadian politician
 Ivon Moore-Brabazon, 3rd Baron Brabazon of Tara (born 1946), British politician
 Ivon Vernon Wilson (1885-1974), New Zealand dentist

See also
Evin (disambiguation)
Evan
Even (disambiguation)
Yvon (disambiguation)
Evon (given name)
Evonne

Masculine given names